Suffield is an unincorporated community and census-designated place (CDP) in Suffield Township, Portage County, Ohio, United States. The population was 949 at the 2020 census. It was first listed as a CDP prior to the 2020 census.

Geography 
The CDP is in southwestern Portage County, in the center of Suffield Township. U.S. Route 224 passes through the north side of the community, leading west  to the south side of Akron and east  to Canfield, near Youngstown.

The CDP is bordered to the southwest by Wingfoot Lake, which drains northwest to the headwaters of the Little Cuyahoga River at Mogadore.

Demographics 

At the 2020 census there were 949 people in the CDP. The population density was 341 people per square mile. There were 418 housing units in the CDP. The racial makeup of the CDP was 94.52% white, 0,1% black, 0,1% Native American, 0,1% Asian, 0,31% from other races, 4,32% from two or more races and 1,37% Hispanic or Latino.

References 

Census-designated places in Portage County, Ohio
Census-designated places in Ohio